Mario Santamaria (born 30 September 1950) is a Nicaraguan boxer. He competed in the men's featherweight event at the 1968 Summer Olympics. At the 1968 Summer Olympics, he lost to Aurel Simion of Romania.

References

1950 births
Living people
Nicaraguan male boxers
Olympic boxers of Nicaragua
Boxers at the 1968 Summer Olympics
Featherweight boxers